Narros can refer to:

 Narros, a municipality in Soria, Castile and León, Spain
 Narros de Matalayegua, a municipality in Salamanca, Castile and León, Spain
 Narros de Saldueña, a municipality in Ávila, Castile and León, Spain
 Narros del Castillo, a municipality in Ávila, Castile and León, Spain
 Narros del Puerto, a municipality in Ávila, Castile and León, Spain

See also
 Narro (disambiguation)